Tem Willesmoes Thordan Hansen (born 18 January 1984) is a former Danish/Faroese professional football midfielder.

Hansen began his professional career with 1. Division side B.93, making his debut in 2002 aged 17. He then went on to play for Brondby IF, Fremad Amager (1. Division) and Lyngby Boldklub (Superliga) before ending the career with BK Søllerød-Vedbæk. Hansen also played for Denmark's U18 and U19 teams before accepting an offer to represent the Faroe Islands in the UEFA qualifiers, making his debut in March 2007 against Ukraine.

External links
Lyngby BK profile
 Brøndby IF profile
Career statistics at Danmarks Radio
Website BK Søllerød-Vedbæk(Danish)

1984 births
Living people
Faroese footballers
Faroe Islands international footballers
Køge Boldklub players
Boldklubben af 1893 players
Lyngby Boldklub players
Danish Superliga players
Faroese expatriate footballers
Expatriate men's footballers in Denmark
Association football midfielders